Kakhrylyar (also, Kakhrilar) is a village in the Tartar Rayon of Azerbaijan.

References 

Populated places in Tartar District